

The Minister of Energy and Resources is a minister in the government of New Zealand with responsibility for the New Zealand Electricity Authority and Energy Efficiency and Conservation Authority. The current Minister is Megan Woods, member of the Labour Party.

List of ministers
The following ministers have held the office of Minister of Energy and Resources.

Key

See also
 Energy in New Zealand

Notes

References

Energy
Energy in New Zealand